Robert Tomlinson was an English professional footballer who played as an outside forward in the Football League for York City, and in non-League football for Castleford Town and Harrogate.

References

Year of birth missing
Sportspeople from Castleford
Year of death missing
English footballers
Association football forwards
Castleford Town F.C. players
Harrogate Town A.F.C. players
York City F.C. players
English Football League players